Life's Quest is the fifth studio album by American rapper 8Ball. The album was released on July 24, 2012, by E1 Music. The album features guest appearances from Keelyn Ellis, Singa, MJG, Big K.R.I.T., LC, Ebony Love, Angie Stone, Slim and 2 Chainz.

Critical reception 

Life's Quest was met with positive reviews from music critics. Neil Martinez-Belkin of XXL gave the album an XL, saying "Life’s Quest carries an overall lighter tone than March’s Premro mixtape. “Don’t Bring Me Down,” featuring 2012’s mandatory 2 Chainz appearance is a highlight (Tity delivers one of his finer novelty verses of late), as is the trunk rattling “Good Girl, Bad Girl.” Including southern rap’s heirs like 2 Chainz and Big K.R.I.T (“We Buy Gold) breathes new life into the Memphis vet’s work. The exclusion of “Far Away,” a booming, heavy metal influenced cut initially intended for the album is perhaps the only miss here, on a well polished album that balances a mixed bag of beats and subject matter. It’s an LP that accurately reflects 8 Ball’s place as one of the finest elder statesmen of southern rap. A hardened pimp? Of course. But one rich with OG wisdom. Life’s Quest imparts much of it."

Commercial performance
The album debuted at number 116 on the Billboard 200 chart, with first-week sales of 3,800 copies in the United States.

Track listing

Charts

References

8Ball & MJG albums
2012 albums